"Took Her to the O" is a song by American rapper King Von, released on February 21, 2020 as the third single from his mixtape Levon James (2020). The song was produced by Chopsquad DJ, and is one of Von's most popular songs. Following his death on November 6, 2020, it peaked at number 47 on the Billboard Hot 100.

Composition
The song finds King Von rapping with aggressive energy over a "sinister, piano-led drill beat". He details an account about him seducing a girl and taking her to the 6400 block of South King Drive, a.k.a. "O'Block". During this, Von is confronted by another man, who is heavily implied to be the real life rapper FBG Duck whom Von knew personally and was from Von's rival neighborhood and the situation turns violent.

Music video
The music video was released alongside the single. In it, King Von recounts the story to his lawyer through rapping the song, with intercutting scenes from the narrative. Interior shots were filmed in Los Angeles.

Charts

Weekly charts

Year-end charts

Certifications

References

2020 singles
2020 songs
King Von songs
Empire Distribution singles